Margot Robbie is an Australian actress and producer who made her film debut in the 2008 film Vigilante. Robbie then landed a role on the long-running Australian soap opera Neighbours (2008–2011, 2022). From 2011 until its cancellation in 2012, she portrayed a stewardess on the television series Pan Am. Her breakout role was in the Martin Scorsese-directed The Wolf of Wall Street (2013) opposite Leonardo DiCaprio. In 2015, she acted alongside Will Smith in the comedy-drama Focus.  In the following year, Robbie played Harley Quinn in the DC Extended Universe film Suicide Squad, later reprising the role in Birds of Prey (2020) and The Suicide Squad (2021). Also in 2016, she played Jane Porter in The Legend of Tarzan. That year she also hosted an episode of Saturday Night Live.

For her starring role as Tonya Harding in the biopic I, Tonya (2017), she was nominated for the Academy Award for Best Actress. The following year, she portrayed Queen Elizabeth I in Mary Queen of Scots, which garnered her a nomination for a Screen Actors Guild Award. That same year, Robbie voiced Flopsy Rabbit in Peter Rabbit. She received a second Academy Award nomination, this time for Best Supporting Actress, for her performance as a Fox News employee in Bombshell (2019). Her portrayal of Sharon Tate in the Quentin Tarantino-directed Once Upon a Time in Hollywood (2019) garnered her a nomination for the BAFTA Award for Best Actress in a Supporting Role. Robbie later reprised the role of Quinn in Birds of Prey in 2020 and in The Suicide Squad, the following year.

Robbie has also produced several projects, including the Hulu television series Dollface (2019–2022), the film Promising Young Woman (2020), and the Netflix miniseries Maid (2021).

Film

Television

Music videos

See also
 List of awards and nominations received by Margot Robbie

References

External links
 
 Margot Robbie at the Rotten Tomatoes
 Margot Robbie on TV Guide

Filmography
Actress filmographies
Australian filmographies